Axel Ehnström is a Finnish songwriter and musician (born on 23 October 1990 in Kirkkonummi, Finland). He is known for writing songs for artists such as Phoebe Ryan, Lost Frequencies and Alle Farben. He participated as Paradise Oskar in the Eurovision Song Contest 2011.

Songwriting career
Axel Ehnström has been involved with several gold and platinum certified albums and has worked with artists such as Phoebe Ryan, Lost Frequencies, Isac Elliot, Anna Abreu, Christopher, Alle Farben, RAF Camorra, Dennis Kruissen, Madeline Juno and Kasmir. Ehnström has worked as a songwriter published by Elements Music since 2013. In 2014, he co-wrote Sofi De La Torre's song "Vermillion", which Billboard declared one of the best songs of the year. Ehnström's recent notable credits include a feature on Lost Frequencies' single ''All Or Nothing'', Deepend's ''Woke up in Bangkok'' and the co-writing of Alle Farben's hugely successful song Bad Ideas, which was the most played song on the German radio for four weeks in a row.

Both the 2016 and 2017 Finnish music industry reports by Music Finland, showed that Ehnström had more international songwriting cuts than any other Finnish songwriter in 2016 and 2017 respectively. In 2018, the Finnish Music Publishers association awarded Ehnström with the music export award of the year for his work in the German music market.

Eurovision Song Contest 2011
Ehnström represented Finland as Paradise Oskar in the Eurovision Song Contest 2011 with the song "Da Da Dam" placing 21st in the finals held in Düsseldorf, Germany. Ehnström received the Marcel Bezençon Press Award given to the best entry as voted on by the accredited media and press during the 2011 Eurovision event. Paradise Oskar's debut album Sunday Songs was released via Warner Music Finland on 2 May 2011.

Personal life
Ehnström's family belongs to the Swedish-speaking minority in Finland. He lives in Evitskog, Kirkkonummi. He adopted the name Paradise Oskar from author Astrid Lindgren's children's book "Rasmus and the Vagabond", where Paradise Oskar is a vagabond who plays the accordion.

Discography

Albums

Songwriting credits

References

External links

1990 births
Living people
People from Kirkkonummi
Swedish-speaking Finns
21st-century Finnish male singers
Finnish male songwriters
Eurovision Song Contest entrants of 2011
Eurovision Song Contest entrants for Finland